Rabbi Yitzchak Isaac Sher was the rosh yeshiva of the Slabodka Yeshiva in Lithuania and Bnei Brak. He was the son-in-law of Rabbi Nosson Tzvi Finkel, the Alter of Slabodka.

Early life 

Rabbi Yitzchak Isaac Sher was born in Halusk, Belarus c. 1875 to R' Yosef Chaim and Esther Leah Sher. After completing cheder, he and other students began attending a class given by Rabbi Baruch Ber Leibowitz, who served as the city's rabbi at that time. He then went to study in the Volozhin Yeshiva under Rabbi Refael Shapiro. After hearing a lecture from the Alter of Slabodka in Halusk, Yitzchak Isaac was inspired and joined his yeshiva in Slabodka, Yeshiva Knesses Yisrael, where he studied with Avraham Grodzinski (later a mashgiach ruchani in the yeshiva).

In 1903, Rabbi Sher married Maryasha Gittel Finkel, a daughter of the Alter of Slabodka. The couple moved to Kelmė where he developed a close relationship with Rabbi Simcha Zissel Ziv (the Alter of Kelm). He studied for a short time in the Mir Yeshiva, which was led by his wife's brother, Rabbi Eliezer Yehudah Finkel.

Early teaching career 

Rabbi Sher soon returned to Slabodka, and in 1911, he was given a teaching position in his father-in-law's yeshiva. Aside from only giving his students a class on Gemara, he also gave them mussar (rebuke to improve their character). This was the first time that a teacher in the Slabodka Yeshiva fulfilled these two roles. The Alter appointed him to this position to show the students that studying Torah as well as mussar do not conflict with each other. (Both in 1897 and in 1904, there were uprisings of students against the study of mussar in the yeshiva). He stayed with the yeshiva throughout their travels during World War I, to Minsk and Kremenchug.

Slabodka Kollel 

In 1921, the Alter founded the Beis Yisrael Kollel (commonly referred to as the "Slabodka Kollel"), and Rabbi Sher became the rosh kollel (head of the kollel). The top students from the Slabodka Yeshiva were chosen to join the kollel, including Rabbi Dovid Leibowitz; his brother Rabbi Moshe Leibowitz; Rabbi Yaakov Kamenetsky, future rosh yeshiva in Torah Vodaath; the three teachers of Yeshiva Ohr Yisrael (the Slabodka Yeshiva's preparatory school) Rabbi Yechezkel Burstein, Rabbi Yosef Farber, and Rabbi Yitzchak Baruchson; and others. Rabbi David Rappoport, Rabbi Yaakov Yitzchak Ruderman, and Rabbi Shabsi Vernokovsky (son-in-law of Rabbi Ber Hersh Heller) were among the members who joined the kollel later.

It was during Rabbi Sher's time as rosh kollel that he began writing his sefer, Beis Yisrael. The kollel would later merge with the Kovno Kollel.

Rosh Yeshiva 

Between 1925 and 1928, much of the Slabodka Yeshiva relocated to Hebron in Mandatory Palestine, including the rosh yeshiva Rabbi Moshe Mordechai Epstein. Rabbi Sher was then appointed rosh yeshiva while Rabbi Ber Hersh Heller continued to serve as mashgiach ruchani, alongside his son-in-law Rabbi Avraham Grodzinski. As rosh yeshiva, the financial burden of the institution fell on him, and Rabbi Sher therefore traveled to America several times to raise funds for the yeshiva.

World War II 

Shortly before the outbreak of World War II, Rabbi Sher, who was in poor health, had gone to a spa in Switzerland, and was therefore spared from the Nazi killings that left thousands murdered in Kaunas and Slabodka, including Rabbi Grodzinski and the students of the yeshiva. During the war, he moved to Jerusalem, where the Chevron Yeshiva had since moved to.

Bnei Brak 

In 1947, at the advice of the Chazon Ish, Rabbi Sher reestablished the European branch of Slabodka in Bnei Brak, together with his son-in-law Rabbi Mordechai Shulman. He was also part of the Moetzes Gedolei HaTorah in Israel and authored the sefer Avraham Avinu.

On February 6, 1952, Rabbi Sher died, after suffering a heart attack. At his funeral, which was attended by thousands of people, eulogies were given by Rabbi Yosef Shlomo Kahaneman and Rabbi Elya Lopian. His grandson-in-law is Rabbi Moshe Hillel Hirsch, current Slabodka rosh yeshiva in Bnei Brak.

References 

Lithuanian Orthodox rabbis
Rabbis in Bnei Brak
Rosh yeshivas
Academic staff of Slabodka yeshiva
Slabodka yeshiva alumni
1870s births
1952 deaths
Year of birth uncertain
Writers of Musar literature
Orthodox rabbis in Mandatory Palestine
People from Hlusk District
Israeli Orthodox rabbis
20th-century Lithuanian rabbis